El Comercio Group (GEC) is a Peruvian media conglomerate that owns multiple newspapers, television stations and other entities. The largest media conglomerate in Peru and one of the largest in South America, El Comercio Group is owned by the owned by the Miró Quesada family.

History 
The newspaper El Comercio was founded by Manuel Amunátegui and Alejandro Villota on 4 May 1839. Originally founded as Infobanco-Teleinformative Services in 1991, would later change to Empresa Editora El Comercio S.A on 1 July 1996.

Canal N was launched as a news channel on 4 July 1999 as a subscription television channel. Plural TV Group was launched on 5 March 2003 in a partnership between El Comercio Group and La República Group, with El Comercio owning seventy percent of Plural TV while La República owned the remaining thirty percent. Canal N, América Televisión, Radio América and Disney Radio Peru were then managed by Plural TV Group.

Epensa purchase 
El Comercio Group acquired Empresa Periodistica Nacional SA (Epensa) in August 2013, resulting with the group owning 80% of the printed press in Peru. Following the controversial acquisition of Epensa, the company began to diversify its operations in 2014, changing its name from Empresa Editora El Comercio S.A. to Vigenta Inversiones S.A. and some of its naming from El Comercio Group to Ecomedia. El Comercio Group also began to enter into the education and entertainment market in Chile and Colombia at the same time.

Operation Caledonia 
In 2019, Perú.21 reported that a group of Peruvian investors secretly tried to purchase the journalist branch of El Comercio Group in what was called "Operation Caledonia", attempting to do so with the help of former mayor of New York City and Keiko Fujimori's former advisor, Rudy Giuliani. According to journalist Augusto Álvarez Rodrich, those included in the Operation Caledonia group included owner of Willax Televisión Erasmo Wong Lu, Peruvian businessman and owner of Expreso Rafael López Aliaga and Popular Force politician José Chlimper.

Influence 
El Comercio Group is the largest media conglomerate in Peru and one of the largest in South America. The company has typically supported political candidates supportive of right-wing politics, including President Alan García and Keiko Fujimori.

The 2013 acquisition of Epensa was controversial to some observers who noted that the purchase of Epensa moved the conglomerate from owning fifty percent of Peru's newspapers purchased up to owning seventy-eight percent of sales. To these observers, the acquisition allowed El Comercio group to limit press freedom by controlling opinions published in their newspapers, though El Comercio Group denied such allegations. President Ollanta Humala denounced the acquisition saying that the move gave the conglomerate too much influence and called on legislators to oversee the controversy. Eight journalists in November 2013 filed a lawsuit in Peru's Constitutional Court to block the acquisition of Epensa and on 24 June 2021, Judge Juan Macedo Cuenca ruled to nullify the purchase citing "a violation of the constitutional right of freedom of expression and information - information pluralism". El Comercio Group decided to appeal the judge's decision.

One of the company's main shareholders José Alejandro Graña Miró Quesada of the Miró Quesada family was arrested in late 2017 after his Graña & Montero construction company was involved in the Odebrecht scandal.

Company units 

El Comercio Group is divided into four Business Units:

 Press Business Unit – The company owns the top five selling newspapers in Peru; Trome, Ojo, Correo, El Comercio and Peru.21. Other press entities include Depor, El Bocón, Gestión, Revista Aptitus,Revista Casa & Más, Revista Hola Perú, Revista G, Revista Mujer Actual, Revista Mujer Trome, Revista Ruedas & Nuts, Revista Somos, Revista Urbania Premiun and Revista Vamos. El Comercio Group also controls the distribution of The New York Times and Publimetro in Peru.
 Television Business Unit – Plural TV Group and its subsidiaries, América Televisión, Canal N, Radio América and Disney Radio Peru.
 Digital Business Unit –  ComercioXpress, Lumingo, Neoauto and PagoEfectivo
 Services Business Unit – Amauta Impresiones Comerciales

See also 

 Media of Peru
 Newspapers in Peru
 Television in Peru

References 

Mass media in Lima
 
Peru
Peru
Television in Peru